MBMS International, now called Multiply, is the global missions agency of the US and Canadian MB (Mennonite Brethren) churches. With missionaries in over 25 countries, Multiply also partners with other Mennonite Brethren conferences around the world in mission work. The International Office is in Abbotsford, British Columbia, Canada.

Historical names include:
MB Mission, MBMS International (MBMSI), Mennonite Brethren Missions/Services (MBM/S) and Board of Missions and Services (BOMAS).

See also
Mennonite
Canadian Conference of Mennonite Brethren Churches 
US Conference of Mennonite Brethren Churches
International Committee of Mennonite Brethren (ICOMB)

External links
 Official website

Mennonitism
Organizations based in British Columbia